The Dale Weejet 800, or Weejet VT-1 was an early light jet intended for high-speed personal transport or primary military training.

Design and development
Harold Dale, an engineer at North American Aviation who had designed several homebuilt aircraft, teamed up with Edward Gagnier, a former North American engineer, to develop the Weejet. The name was registered in February 1952 and the prototype was built in 2 1/2 years.

The Weejet was a two-seat side-by-side, mid-winged all-aluminum, retractable tricycle gear aircraft with a V-tail arrangement. The aircraft was powered by a 920lb thrust Continental-Turbomeca Marbore II J-69-T-15 engine. Air was fed to the engine through two triangular inlets mounted on the inboard wing roots. Fuel was carried in the leading edge of the wings, and tip tanks. The aircraft had oxygen tanks and was pressurized to 3 psi differential pressure. The seats were designed to accommodate parachutes. The rudder pedals were adjustable for different pilot heights.

Operational history
The first test flight was conducted by Harold Dale on 30 March 1956. The aircraft completed several spin tests, but during one test the canopy opened and the aircraft went into an inverted spin. The pilot bailed out safely and the prototype crashed after performing an unmanned inverted loop. It was later found that the trim tab was set to full nose-down attitude during the test. A scheduled demonstration of the aircraft for the U.S. Navy was canceled. No other Weejets were produced.

Specifications (Dale Weejet 800)

See also

References

Single-engined jet aircraft
1950s United States sport aircraft
Aircraft manufactured in the United States